Your Father's Room is a 2004 novel by the French writer Michel Déon. It is set in Paris and Monaco in the 1920s and follows a young boy, Édouard, called Teddy. The book is a fictionalised autobiography based on Déon's childhood.

Publication
The book was published in France on 5 February 2004 through éditions Gallimard. An English translation is set to be published through Gallic Books on 1 June 2017 in the United Kingdom and 13 June 2017 in the United States.

Reception
Yasmina Reza of Le Figaro called the book "one of the most beautiful stories about grief that you can read".

References

External links
 French publicity page 
 British publicity page

2004 French novels
French autobiographical novels
French-language novels
Novels by Michel Déon
Novels set in Monaco
Novels set in Paris
Novels set in the 1920s
Éditions Gallimard books